The Archdeacon of Dorset is a senior ecclesiastical officer within the Diocese of Salisbury, England. He or she is responsible for the disciplinary supervision of the clergy within the four area deaneries: Purbeck, Poole, Wimborne, and Milton & Blandford.

History
The role of archdeacons within the diocese of Salisbury originated around the time of the Norman Conquest; the first recorded archdeacon titled Archdeacon of Dorset occurs as an officer of that diocese from the mid-12th century. The archdeaconry was transferred to the diocese of Bristol upon its creation on 4 June 1542, and later returned to Salisbury diocese by Order in Council on 7 October 1836.

The post is currently held by Antony MacRow-Wood.

List of archdeacons
Some archdeacons without territorial titles are recorded from around the time of the Norman Conquest; see Archdeacon of Salisbury.

High Medieval
bef. 1139–aft. 1173: Adelelm (also Dean of Lincoln from bef. 1145)
bef. 1184–aft. 1193: William
bef. 1196–aft. 1198: Richard
Ranulph son of Robert (disputed)
bef. 1200–aft. 1214 (res.): Adam
bef. 1222–aft. 1225: Herbert
bef. 1226–aft. 1241: Humphrey
bef. 1245–aft. 1255: Gerard de Bingham
bef. 1258–aft. 1258: Giordano Pironti
 (res.): Simon of Bridport
bef. 1271–aft. 1271: John
?–bef. 1275 (res.): Gerard de Grandson
Antony Bek was provided but did not take office.
bef. 1275–aft. 1280 (res.): Thomas Bek
bef. 1281–1284 (res.): Henry Brandeston (previously Archdeacon of Wilts; became Dean of Salibury)
bef. 1287–1297 (d.): William de la Wyle
1297–aft. 1316 (d.): Henry de Bluntesdon

Late Medieval
29 September 1316–bef. 1321: Peter de Periton
3 January 1321–aft. 1339: Thomas de Hotoft
28 January 1340–bef. 1346 (d.): John de Kirkeby
bef. 1347–aft. 1352: Bertrand Cardinal de Deucio (Cardinal-priest
of San Marco)
bef. 1373–1378 (res.): Robert Cardinal de Geneva (Cardinal-priest
of Santi XII Apostoli; afterwards Pope at Avignon)
18 November 1378–?: Thomas Pays
bef. 1380–bef. 1386: Niccolò Cardinal Caracciolo Moschino (Cardinal-priest
of San Ciriaco alle Terme Diocleziane)
7 January 1386–bef. 1388: Ralph Erghum (possibly the Bishop of Salisbury)
13 September 1388–aft. 1390: Robert Ragenhull
Disputed period:
bef. 1396–bef. 1397 (d.): Adam Cardinal Easton (Cardinal-priest
of Santa Cecilia in Trastevere; Papal grant)
bef. 1397–bef. 1397 (d.): Michael Cergeaux (Royal grant)
1397: Walter Medford (Royal grant)
1397–30 June 1398 (deprived): Nicholas Bubwith (Papal grant)
3 September 1397 – 1400: Henry Chichele (Bishop's man)
9 July 1400 – 1406 (res.): Nicholas Bubwith (again)
11 December 1406 – 22 February 1437 (exch.): John Mackworth

22 February 1437–bef. 1440 (d.): John Hody (possibly the justice)
19 July 1440–bef. 1447 (d.): John Stopyndon
25 May 1447–bef. 1449 (d.): Robert Aiscough
14 February 1449–bef. 1486 (d.): William Aiscough
25 June 1486–bef. 1514 (res.): Robert Langton
20 May 1514 – 1523 (res.): Richard Pace
17 January 1523 – 1530 (res.): John Stokesley
20 December 1530–bef. 1533 (d.): William Bennet
25 November 1533 – 1535 (res.) Edward Foxe
bef. 1539–bef. 1542 (res.): John Skypp (also Bishop of Hereford from 1539)

Early modern
1542–aft. 1547: Thomas Canner
1551–1572 (d.): John Cotterell
1572–aft. 1584: Henry Tynchiner
1572–1575 (rem.): James Proctor (disputed)
?–bef. 1621 (d.): Edward Wickham
1621–bef. 1654 (d.): Richard Fitzherbert
1660–bef. 1671 (d.): Richard Meredith
16 September 1671 – 5 March 1683 (d.): Ralph Ironside
25 March 1683–bef. 1698 (d.): The Hon John Feilding
1698–bef. 1733 (d.): Robert Cooper
7 May 1733–bef. 1762 (d.): Edward Hammond
21 May 1762 – 15 November 1780 (d.): John Walker
11 November 1780 – 19 April 1801 (res.): Watson Hand
2 May 1801 – 29 May 1815 (d.): Henry Hall
3 June 1815 – 13 November 1835 (d.): William England
9 January 1836 – 13 January 1862 (res.): Robert Buckle

Late modern
1862–1889: Thomas Sanctuary
1889–1901 (res.): Francis Sowter
1902–1927 (ret.): Charles Dundas
1927–1929 (d.): Eric Bodington
1929–7 April 1940 (d.): Okes Parish
1940–22 June 1947 (d.): Harold Rodgers
1948–1955: Lancelot Addison 
1955–1974 (ret.): Edward Seagar (afterwards archdeacon emeritus)
1975–1982 (ret.): Richard Sharp (afterwards archdeacon emeritus)
1982–2000 (ret.): Geoffrey Walton (afterwards archdeacon emeritus)
2000–2009 (res.): Alistair Magowan
2009–2010: Patrick Evans (Acting)
18 April 2010 – 14 February 2015 (res.): Stephen Waine
24 June 2015–present: Antony MacRow-Wood

References

Sources

 
Lists of Anglicans
Lists of English people